Vikebygd is a former municipality in the old Hordaland county, Norway. The municipality existed from 1902 until its dissolution in 1964. It was located along the eastern and western shores of the Ålfjorden, a small branch off the main Hardangerfjorden.  The  municipality is located in the present-day municipalities of Sveio (in Hordaland county) and in Vindafjord (in Rogaland county). The administrative centre of the municipality was the village of Vikebygd, where Vikebygd Church is located.

History
Historically, the parish of Vikebygd was a part of the old municipality of Fjeldberg. In 1865, Vikebygd parish became a part of the new municipality of Sveen. On 1 January 1902, the eastern part of the municipality of Sveen was separated to form the new municipality of Vikebygd. Initially, Vikebygd had a population of 1,092.

During the 1960s, there were many municipal mergers across Norway due to the work of the Schei Committee. On 1 January 1964, the municipality of Vikebygd was dissolved. Using Ålfjorden as a dividing line the western part of Vikebygd (population: 471) was merged into the neighboring municipality of Sveio and the eastern part (population: 578) was merged into the neighboring municipality of Ølen. On 1 January 2006, all of Ølen municipality was incorporated into Vindafjord municipality in Rogaland county.

Municipal council
The municipal council  of Vikebygd was made up of 17 representatives who were elected to four year terms. The party breakdown of the final municipal council was as follows:

See also
List of former municipalities of Norway

References

Former municipalities of Norway
Sveio
Vindafjord
1902 establishments in Norway
1964 disestablishments in Norway